CDR Canal 2 is a Costa Rican music television channel. The frequency belonged to Roxie Blen until 2011 when the station was sold to Central de Radios, a unit of Repretel. The channel broadcasts on digital channel 11.2 which is used for its sister channel Canal 11 due to the frequency being impossible to convert to digital until 2021. The channel was previously owned by Univision which was named as Univsion Canal 2 until 2000.

Television stations in Costa Rica
Spanish-language television stations
Television channels and stations established in 1970